The Campbell Fighting Camels soccer team represents Campbell University in all NCAA Division I men's college soccer competitions. The Fighting Camels currently play in the Big South Conference, and are coached by Dustin Fonder. The program plays their home matches at the Eakes Athletics Complex.

Most the program's success came in the mid-1980s to early 1990s, and in the late 2010s to early 2020s. The Camels have won eight total Big South tournament championships, seven of which came during those listed eras. The Camels have won four Big South regular season titles. 

The program's most successful season came in 2019, when they won their first NCAA Tournament game in program history, reaching the second round, where they lost to eventual national runners-up, Virginia. Campbell has produced several players that have gone out to play professional soccer including Thibaut Jacquel, Jake Morris, and Josue Soto.

Coaching staff 
As of March 13, 2022. Number of seasons includes the upcoming fall 2022 season.

Championships

Conference regular season championships

Conference tournament championships

Seasons

Postseason

NCAA tournament results 
Georgia State has appeared in five NCAA Tournaments. Their combined record is 1–4–1.

Stadiums 
The Camels play most of their games at the 1,000-capacity Eakes Athletics Complex.

See also 
 Campbell Lady Camels soccer

References

External links 
 

 
Association football clubs established in 1963
1963 establishments in North Carolina